is a character from Sega's Sonic the Hedgehog series. He is a red anthropomorphic short-beaked echidna who is Sonic's best friend and former rival. Determined and serious, but sometimes gullible, he punches enemies with brute force. He serves as the guardian of the Master Emerald, a huge gemstone that controls the series's integral Chaos Emeralds, and is the last living member of his tribe, the Knuckles Clan.

Knuckles debuted as an antagonist in Sonic the Hedgehog 3 (1994) after Doctor Eggman tricks him into opposing Sonic and Tails. He first became a playable protagonist in Sonic & Knuckles later that year; after initially opposing Sonic once again, he forms an alliance with him after learning of Doctor Eggman's trickery. Since then, he has appeared in dozens of playable and non-playable roles, as well as in several series of comic books, Western animated television, Japanese anime, the Sonic the Hedgehog 2 feature film and its upcoming sequel.

One of the series's most popular characters, Knuckles has appeared in most games in the franchise, including those for the main series and spin-offs. His likeness has also frequently appeared in several pieces of Sonic the Hedgehog merchandise, and he has been the subject of multiple Internet memes.

Concept and creation
During conception of Sonic the Hedgehog 3, the development team wanted to create a new rival for Sonic. The final design of Knuckles was the result of dozens of possible designs inspired by numerous different animals. In collaboration between the Sonic Team and Sega of America's product marketing manager, Pamela Kelly, the final character of "Knuckles" was chosen. The emphasis of the character was to break walls, with the original idea being a 'whirlwind' ability, rather than punching. 

Knuckles was created by developer Takashi Yuda, who never intended him to be any more than a "supporting character". Knuckles was introduced in Sonic the Hedgehog 3 as an "intimidator" because of his powerful abilities and physical strength. He was given a headlining role in the next game, Sonic & Knuckles, where he made his first appearance as a playable character.

Voice portrayal

Knuckles has been voiced by several different actors over the years. In the Japanese dubs, he was voiced by Yasunori Matsumoto in Sonic the Hedgehog: The Movie
and by Nobutoshi Canna since 1998, beginning with Sonic Adventure.

In animation, he was voiced by Brian Drummond in Sonic Underground and by Bill Wise in the English dub of Sonic the Hedgehog: The Movie.

In the video games, Knuckles was originally voiced by Michael McGaharn in Sonic Adventure, and then by Ryan Drummond in Sonic Shuffle. Scott Dreier began voicing the character in 2001, starting with Sonic Adventure 2. He continued to voice the character for three more years until 2004, his final role as Knuckles was in Sonic Advance 3. Dan Green began voicing the character in the anime series Sonic X, he would later take over the role in the video games in 2005, starting with Shadow the Hedgehog. In 2010, he was replaced by Travis Willingham, beginning with Sonic Free Riders. Willingham continued voicing the character until 2018, and his final role as Knuckles was in Super Smash Bros. Ultimate. Since 2019, Knuckles has been voiced by Dave B. Mitchell, beginning with Team Sonic Racing. In the film Sonic the Hedgehog 2, Knuckles is voiced by Idris Elba. Elba is set to reprise the role again in the upcoming Knuckles spin-off series, which is set for release on the streaming service Paramount+ in 2023. In the 2022 Sonic short film, Sonic Drone Home, Knuckles is voiced by Fred Tatasciore. In the Netflix series Sonic Prime, Knuckles is voiced by Adam Nurada, while his Shatterverse counterparts (respectively named Renegade Knucks, Gnarly Knuckles, and Knuckles the Dread) are voiced by Vincent Tong.

Characteristics
Knuckles is a fictional red anthropomorphic echidna, the only living descendant of a well-established clan of echidnas. For many years, his clan guarded a giant gemstone called the Master Emerald, which controls the Chaos Emeralds, objects central to the Sonic the Hedgehog game series. As such, Knuckles has spent most of his life atop a floating island called Angel Island, guarding the Master Emerald from harm. He has grown up fairly introverted as a result.

Knuckles has a personality described as cool. However, he sometimes loses his composure and gets in fights with other characters, and he can be shy around girls. His favorite food is grapes, and his relationship with Sonic is ambivalent. However in later games, their relationship became more unequivocal: Knuckles entered the series as an antagonist of Sonic but later becomes one of the protagonists and sees him as a partner, while envying Sonic's adventurous lifestyle. He is depicted as somewhat gullible and very rash, especially when angered. Since he never left Angel Island, he has often been tricked by Doctor Robotnik but is stated in one game manual to have become more skeptical of him, possibly due to the multiple times of getting fooled by Robotnik.

While slower than Sonic, Knuckles is depicted as one of the series's strongest characters and a skilled martial artist: his brawny physique allows him to lift objects many times his size and weight, while his powerful fists enable him to smash boulders and break through solid ground. He can also glide long distances and climb up walls using the spikes of his gloves. Unlike Sonic, Knuckles is able to swim. As is typical among Sonic characters, Knuckles can roll into a ball to attack enemies. He also has an empowered "super" form: using the Chaos Emeralds allows him to transform into Super Knuckles. Using the Super Emeralds allows him to transform into Hyper Knuckles.

Appearances

In video games

Knuckles debuted in the 1994 Sega Genesis game Sonic the Hedgehog 3. Knuckles joins the series's primary antagonist Dr. Robotnik after being tricked into thinking that Sonic is attempting to steal the Master Emerald; Knuckles fights Sonic at several points throughout the game. Robotnik's betrayal is revealed late in Sonic & Knuckles when he steals the Master Emerald and attacks Knuckles, Sonic & Knuckles is also the first game where he became a player character, his story takes place after Sonic's Story. A similar plot follows in Sonic Triple Trouble. While Knuckles's canonical playable debut comes in Sonic & Knuckles, he is playable in Sonic 2 and 3 via the Genesis' lock-on technology. Knuckles starred in Knuckles' Chaotix for the Sega 32X, in which he serves as the guardian of an island amusement park and rescues his friends—collectively known as the Chaotix—from Robotnik in 1995. He teams up with them individually, creating an unusual gameplay style involving two characters being tethered together.

Eggman shatters the Master Emerald, thus freeing Chaos who appears before Knuckles, the pieces are scattered, and Chaos flees in Sonic Adventure. To restore the Emerald, thereby protecting Angel Island, he searches through various expansive levels for pieces. At one point, he defeats Chaos, and Eggman tricks Knuckles into thinking that Sonic is trying to collect Emerald shards for his own purposes. Knuckles finds Sonic holding two Chaos Emeralds he thinks are Master Emerald shards, and attacks him. This knocks them out of Sonic's hands, so Eggman shows up to steal them and leaves. He initially stays on Earth to look for pieces while Sonic and Tails follow Eggman, but later joins them aboard Eggman's airship, the Egg Carrier, after seeing a vision of there being more pieces on it. He finds the final pieces and is confronted by Chaos' final form, then returns to the Emerald's island to restore it.

Early in Sonic Adventure 2, Knuckles and Rouge argue over the Emerald; she wants the pieces for her personal collection. Eggman tries to steal it, so Knuckles shatters it aboard Eggman's hovercraft, sending the pieces every which way, while also mentioning that if the shards are found they can be made whole. He spends the game recollecting the pieces like in Adventure. He later helps Sonic, Tails, and Amy find Eggman's base inside a giant pyramid and a key to an inner chamber housing a giant Space Shuttle. He follows them to a giant space station called the ARK with it, where he again scuffles with Rouge over the Emerald. He saves her from falling into a constructed pit of lava; she decides the shards are worthless and dismissively lets him keep them, so he reassembles the Emerald and runs off. The antagonist Gerald Robotnik, Eggman's grandfather, initiates a program to send the ARK on a collision course with Earth as revenge for an attack on the ARK decades earlier, so Knuckles teams up with the other playable characters to reroute it.

Knuckles serves as a power-based character in Sonic Heroes alongside Sonic and Tails, who respectively represent speed and flight. They team up to defeat Eggman after receiving a letter saying that he will destroy the world in three days. However, it turns out that Eggman is being impersonated by Metal Sonic, whom all of the other characters defeat together. Knuckles helps Sonic, Tails, Amy Rose, and Cream the Rabbit stop Eggman from building an empire in the Sonic Advance trilogy. With the same team, Knuckles recurs in Sonic Riders and its two sequels; in each game, they participate in board-racing competitions together. In another team-based installment, the role-playing game Sonic Chronicles: The Dark Brotherhood, Knuckles is a playable character with a major role in the story. The game begins with Tails informing Sonic that Knuckles has been kidnapped, so a team beginning as Sonic, Tails, Amy, and Rouge must rescue him. He is eventually saved, and it is revealed that the echidna race is still alive in the form of the helpful Shade the Echidna and her villainous tribe, the Nocturnus.

He is a minor character in Sonic Rush, where he accosts protagonist Blaze the Cat under the impression that she has stolen Chaos Emeralds. In the Nintendo DS version of Sonic Colors, Knuckles arrives at an amusement park Eggman has created after receiving a letter. Frustrated at having been tricked, he challenges Sonic to a race as a mission, but shortly learns that Rouge wrote the letter inviting him to the park. He has a short argument with Rouge. Modern Knuckles gives Classic and Modern Sonic missions and helpful advice in Sonic Generations. In Sonic Lost World, Knuckles and Amy look after forest animals while Sonic and Tails rescue the animals' friends. Later, the Deadly Six, the game's antagonists, take control of one of Eggman's machines to drain life from the world, and Amy and Knuckles die, but they are brought back to life when Sonic and Tails replenish it. He is a playable character in Sonic Mania Plus, regaining his role from the first games alongside Sonic, Tails, Mighty and Ray. He appears in the game Sonic Forces, where he becomes the leader of a resistance created to fight back against Eggman's advancing forces. In Sonic Frontiers, Knuckles inadvertently arrives on the Starfall Islands while investigating some ruins on the Angel Island, once there he is captured by Sage. After Sonic releases his digital form who helps him search for the Chaos Emeralds, Knuckles notices that the ruins of Starfall Islands are similar to those on Angel Island, making him and Sonic wonder if the inhabitants of the islands resettled there after their arrival on the planet. After comparing the extinction of the Ancients and his own people reminds him that he is the last of his kind, Sonic encourages him to live his life to the fullest and not make the protection of the Master Emerald his sole purpose in life, with Knuckles deciding to heed his advice after he is free from Cyber space.

Knuckles has been a playable character in numerous spinoff games with little effect on the series's plot, such as the fighting game Sonic the Fighters, the racing title Sonic R, and the party title Sonic Shuffle, as well as crossover games like Mario & Sonic at the Olympic Games and Sonic & All-Stars Racing Transformed. He makes a cameo appearance in Sega Superstars Tennis, as a member of the audience in the Green Hill court and in Super Smash Bros. Brawl Green Hill stage, where he, Tails, and Silver run through the vertical loop in the background. Knuckles appears as one of four playable characters in the action-adventure spin-off property Sonic Boom (Rise of Lyric and Shattered Crystal). In Lego Dimensions, Knuckles appears as a non-playable character in the Sonic the Hedgehog world, in which he requests the player to assist him in a sidequest to take down some of Eggman's robots, during which he makes a number of references to the rap songs about him in the Sonic Adventure games. Knuckles also makes a cameo as an easter egg in Deus Ex: Mankind Divided on the box of a video game entitled Knuckles the Echidna in Knuckles & Knuckles & Knuckles which stems off of a running joke regarding the "& Knuckles" part of the title card when Sonic 3 is locked on to the Sonic and Knuckles cartridge. In Super Smash Bros. Ultimate, Knuckles appears as an assist trophy that attacks players when summoned; he also appears as a spirit.

In comics
In Sonic the Comic, Knuckles plays a similar role to that of the games. When the Death Egg crashes on Angel Island, Knuckles is briefly tricked by Dr. Robotnik and thus allows Robotnik to place his robot armies on the island and construct a base to repair his Death Egg. Knuckles also assists him in fighting Sonic and stealing Sonic's own six Emeralds so they can be combined with Knuckles's into one set of Emeralds. However, Knuckles does not trust Robotnik enough to tell him that he possesses a seventh Emerald that can control the others, and when Robotnik tries to absorb the Emeralds' power into himself, Knuckles uses this Emerald to defeat him. From that point on, he works as an ally against Robotnik, starting by removing all traces of the doctor's influences from Angel Island.

In the comic series of Sonic the Hedgehog published by Archie Comics, Knuckles is the eighteenth guardian of the Floating Island, which is also called Angel Island. He is also a member of the Brotherhood of Guardians, a secret society that defends the island and is made up of Knuckles's predecessors/ancestors. In keeping with the incorporation of elements of the Sonic the Hedgehog cartoon into the series, Knuckles lives on the planet Mobius. Knuckles is supported in his efforts by the Chaotix, and often works together with Sonic the Hedgehog and the Freedom Fighters.

When Knuckles was first introduced he was the lone defender of the island, but differences between this continuity and the games were quickly introduced. Writer Ken Penders built up a considerable backstory for Knuckles, in which he is abandoned by his father, Locke, as part of his Guardian training. He was later tricked by Robotnik into believing that Sonic and Tails were on their way to steal the Chaos Emerald and its powers. After a short melee, Robotnik blatantly betrayed Knuckles, causing him to join Sonic in a begrudging team-up, which eventually grew into a strong friendship.

Not too long after that, he formed the Chaotix along with Vector, out of the few refugee inhabitants on Angel Island at the time and would leave the island to their care if he ever had to leave. The Chaotix at the time were Knuckles the Echidna, Vector the Crocodile, Espio the Chameleon, Mighty the Armadillo, Charmy Bee, Heavy, and Bomb, but later saw the addition of Ray the Flying Squirrel, Julie-Su the Echidna (who became his love interest), and Saffron Bee (Charmy's betrothed), while Heavy and Bomb departed and later joined the King's Secret Service. Knuckles was also revealed to have a mystically significant destiny as "the Avatar," corresponding to similar destinies shared by Tails and Sonic. He and Princess Sally Acorn were also revealed to be childhood friends, having met when she and her father paid a visit to the Floating Island while Knuckles's father was Guardian.

After believing himself to be the last living Echidna for some time, Knuckles stumbled upon the existence of others; his earliest encounters with others of his people would earn him enemies. The first would be his great-uncle Dimitri, who had been possessed by a malevolent spirit and become an evil being known as Enerjak. He would then run across a cyborg army known as the Dark Legion-led by Dimitri's descendants-who had previously been banished to another dimension by one of the Knuckles's ancestors. Julie-Su started out as a member of this group but defected to join Knuckles after an Echidna sixth sense known as the Soultouch identified Knuckles as an ideal soul mate. Accompanied by Julie, Knuckles would come across others of his kind, including the city of Echidnaopolis-home to his mother after she divorced his father Locke-the Brotherhood of Guardians, and the hidden city of Albion.

Knuckles's early adventures typically involved protecting Angel Island or the various Echidna groups-only rarely would he join the Freedom Fighters against threats like Dr. Robotnik. However, Robotnik's encroachments on different areas of the planet-including Angel Island itself-eventually persuaded Knuckles to relocate to the surface to join the battle against the evil doctor and other threats. One of his enemies-a villainous Echidna named Dr. Finitevus-later made Knuckles into a new Enerjak after revealing that Robotnik had driven the Echidna race to the brink of extinction. Knuckles would become wracked with guilt over his actions, especially since the remnants of the Dark Legion chose to ally themselves with Dr. Robotnik.

The final blow would come when Knuckles responded to a distress call from his people and arrived in Albion to find it deserted. This would be revealed to be the work of Thrash the Tasmanian Devil, whose people were mutated by ancient Echidnas. Thrash's actions led to almost all the remaining Echidnas being banished from Mobius, with Knuckles failing to rescue them. In reality, the disappearance of these characters-among others-was due to a lawsuit by Ken Penders.

As a result of the continuity reboot that followed the crossover with the Mega Man franchise, Knuckles became virtually indistinguishable from his video game counterpart: he is the last known Echidna and the last Guardian of Master Emerald, and the Chaotix no longer serve as his full-time support team.

In animation
Knuckles's animation debut came with the 1996 Japanese Sonic the Hedgehog OVA. Sonic and Tails meet him during their trip into the Land of Darkness, and over the course of the film he helps them defeat Black Eggman/Metal Robotnik and Hyper Metal Sonic, two robots created by Eggman/Robotnik. As Metal is about to descend into a lava pit, Sonic attempts to save him after all, but Knuckles holds him back and Sonic is disappointed. Knuckles play-fights with Sonic a few times in the film as well.

Knuckles is a minor character in Sonic Underground. Sonic, Sonia, and Manic meet Knuckles atop his home, the Floating Island while searching for their mother. Knuckles is initially skeptical of them but soon accepts their help in protecting the Island and its guardian Chaos Emerald from villains Sleet and Dingo. Later on, the siblings recruit Knuckles to help them deactivate Doctor Robotnik's giant fortress, as it is powered by Emeralds and he can control them. They succeed, but Sleet and Dingo accidentally break the Emerald, unleashing gradually effective but massive energy upon the planet Mobius, and Knuckles enlists one of his relatives to help them control it, with mediocre results. Reluctantly, Knuckles cuts a deal with Robotnik to turn over the hedgehogs in exchange for setting Mobius right; Robotnik succeeds and starts turning the hedgehogs into robots, but Knuckles betrays Robotnik to rescue his friends.

Knuckles appears in all three seasons of Sonic X. He takes guarding Master Emerald seriously and has a fearsome temper with a "chip on his shoulder". After being stranded in the new world with Sonic, his only desire is to get back home quickly. He spends most of the first season traveling alone, but as the series continues he begins to travel with Sonic and the others more often, as well as befriending other characters. After returning home for the third season, he joins Sonic on the spaceship, "Blue Typhoon", which is captained by Tails after their planet was invaded by the Metarex.

Knuckles is among the main cast in the Sonic Boom computer-animated series, and had been redesigned for it: now being taller and more muscular than before. As a somewhat exaggerated reference to his mainstream counterpart's easily deceived personality (as well as being based on the stereotypical team muscles), Knuckles is also portrayed as being somewhat slow-witted and goofy in this series.

Knuckles appears as a supporting character in Sonic Prime. After Sonic shatters the Paradox Prism, which results in the creation of multiple parallel dimensions at the expense of his own, multiple versions of Knuckles are made as well; such as Renegade Knucks who is a rebel against the Chaos Council of New Yoke City, the feral and paranoid Gnarly, and the pirate captain Knuckles the Dread. Knuckles is voiced by Adam Nurada and his variants are voiced by Vincent Tong.

In other media
While Knuckles does not appear in the Sonic series's first theatrical film, Sonic the Hedgehog, his existence is alluded to within the film's opening sequence in which a young Sonic and his caretaker Longclaw are attacked by a native clan of Echidnas. Co-writer Pat Casey has since stated that they are Echidnas within Sonic's world, thus confirming Knuckles's species does exist within that film's universe. Casey also hinted that a connection between the first film's Echidna tribe and Knuckles could be explored in the film's sequel. 

Knuckles appears alongside Sonic and Tails in the second film, voiced by Idris Elba. In the film, it is revealed he is the last of the Echidna Tribe, as the rest of his kind went extinct due to a war between them and the owls, and has a grudge against Sonic since he was Longclaw's apprentice. After being informed of Sonic's location by Dr. Robotnik, he teams up with the scientist and travels to Earth to defeat Sonic and seek out the Master Emerald to honor his ancestors. At the temple where the Emerald is located, Robotnik betrays Knuckles and leaves him to die, but he is rescued by Sonic. He teams up with Sonic and Tails to defeat Robotnik in Green Hills and reclaims the Master Emerald. The three agree to safeguard the Emerald as they live with Sonic's adoptive Earth family, the Wachowskis. 

Knuckles is also set to appear as the main character of a spinoff series being developed for Paramount+, with Elba set to reprise the role.

Reception and impact
The character has received positive attention. According to IGN's Levi Buchanan, fans "seemed legitimately happy" with the addition of the character of Knuckles, who was popular enough to get marquee billing in Sonic & Knuckles, but Buchanan felt that characters who came after him were going "overboard". IGN's Colin Moriarty singled out the introduction of both Knuckles and Tails as when the series became "iffy" and listed them and all other characters in the series, sans Sonic and Robotnik, as being 2nd most in need to "die" on his top 10 list. In contrast, he was listed as the best Sonic character by Official Nintendo Magazine based on the impact he brought to the Sonic games in which he first appeared. Similarly, Complex writer Elijah Watson considers him a better character than Sonic. Watson praises his debut in Sonic the Hedgehog 3, and adds "Knuckles could have never been Sega's mascot; the echidna lacks the sociability of Sonic and his Nintendo counterpart, Mario. And yet this defining characteristic is what makes him so appealing. He is Sega's anti-hero: the dreadlocked brawler who is surprisingly selfless and has a soft spot for grapes and adorable animals."

According to official Sonic Team polls, Knuckles is the fourth most popular character in the series, following behind Tails, Shadow, and Sonic. Elton Jones from Complex listed Knuckles as his eleventh most wanted character in the next Super Smash Bros. game. In another article, Complex regarded Knuckles as a better character than Sonic, and praised his gliding and climbing abilities, stating "even if his levels were a little more challenging than Sonic's, the thrill of being able to explore certain parts of levels that the blue-colored hero could not be worth it". Ravi Sinha of GamingBolt named Knuckles's appearance in Sonic Boom as one of their "Worst Video Game Character Design", stating that "For as annoying as Sonic’s rework was in Sonic Boom, Knuckles was way more baffling. Even worse is that his character is little more than a “dumb jock,” with oddly intellectual viewpoints in the animated series because it’s randomly funny or something."

Mega Zones review of Knuckles' Chaotix praised the introduction of a new protagonist, whom it deemed "rougher and tougher" in comparison to the "spineless" Sonic. Mean Machines Sega called Knuckles's powers "impressive" and the character overall more useful and promising than Tails. Sega Magazine stated that Knuckles "looks cooler" than Sonic, comparing him to Spider-Man, and suggested he be given his own game. Sega Magazine later called him "groovy" and "ace", concluding that they "love him." Knuckles's characterization in Sonic Boom earned praise from Polygon due to how "progressive" he is when mentioning feminism much to the shock of the characters.

Ugandan Knuckles meme

In late December 2017, players began to flood the virtual reality video game VRChat with avatars depicting a deformed version of the character called "Ugandan Knuckles". The character stemmed from a 2017 review of Sonic Lost World by YouTube user Gregzilla as well as from fans of PlayerUnknown's Battlegrounds streamer Forsen who often make references to Uganda in the chat section of his streams. The character is often associated with quotes such as "Do you know da wae?" and "Save the queen!" among many other quotes, which originate from the 2010 Ugandan action comedy film Who Killed Captain Alex? as well as for "spitting" on other users whom they feel do not know "da wae".

The meme was criticized by some journalists as being racially insensitive; Polygon described it as "problematic". The creator of the avatar, DeviantArt user "tidiestflyer", has expressed regret over how it has been used, in particular saying that he hopes it is not used to annoy players of VRChat, and that he enjoys the game and he does not want to see anyone's rights get taken away because of the avatar. In response, in January 2018 the developers of VRChat published an open letter on Medium, stating that they were developing "new systems to allow the community to better self moderate" and asking users to use the built-in muting features.

See also
 List of Sonic the Hedgehog characters

References

External links

 Knuckles at Sonic-City (archived)
 Knuckles at Sonic Channel 

Animal characters in video games
Animal superheroes
Anthropomorphic mammals
Anthropomorphic video game characters
Fictional boxers
Fictional fist-load fighters
Fictional monotremes
Male characters in video games
Sega protagonists
Sonic the Hedgehog characters
Teenage characters in video games
Video game bosses
Video game characters introduced in 1994
Video game characters who can move at superhuman speeds
Video game characters with superhuman strength
Video game memes
Video game superheroes